Curt Löwgren (20 December 1908 – 15 March 1967) was a Swedish film actor. He appeared in 45 films between 1943 and 1966.

Selected filmography
 In Darkest Smaland (1943)
 Dance, My Doll (1953)
 Sawdust and Tinsel (1953)
 Men in the Dark (1955)
 Getting Married (1955)
 Whoops! (1955)
 The People of Hemsö (1955)
 The Unicorn (1955)
 When the Mills are Running (1956)
 The Girl in Tails (1956)
 A Little Nest (1956)
 Encounters in the Twilight (1957)
 Musik ombord (1958)
 The Lady in Black (1958)
 Woman in a Fur Coat (1958)
 The Great Amateur (1958)
 Rider in Blue (1959)
 A Lion in Town (1959)
 Åsa-Nisse as a Policeman (1960)
 Heart's Desire (1960)
 Lovely Is the Summer Night (1961)
 The Lady in White (1962)

References

External links

1908 births
1967 deaths
Swedish male film actors
20th-century Swedish male actors